Masterpiece: World Tour (Sold Out) is a live version of the album Masterpiece by R.K.M & Ken-Y. It was released on December 12, 2006 and includes a DVD of the concert in Puerto Rico.

Track listing

Charts

References

2006 live albums
R.K.M & Ken-Y albums